The 1998 Hamilton Tiger-Cats season was the 41st season for the team in the Canadian Football League and their 49th overall. The Tiger-Cats finished in 1st place in the East Division for the first time since 1989, when they last appeared in the Grey Cup, with a 12–5–1 record. They appeared in the Grey Cup where they lost to the Stampeders.

Offseason

CFL Draft

Preseason

Regular season

Season standings

Schedule

Postseason

Grey Cup

Awards and honours

1998 CFL All-Stars

References

Hamilton Tiger-Cats seasons
James S. Dixon Trophy championship seasons
Hamilton